Wesley is a suburb of Auckland, New Zealand, located in the south-west of the Auckland isthmus. The area is a part of the Oakley Creek catchment, and in the 19th and early 20th centuries was primarily swampland owned by the Weslayan Mission. The New Zealand Government developed Wesley as a state housing area in the 1940s and 1950s.

Geography

Wesley is a suburb of Auckland on the Auckland isthmus, bound by  New Windsor in the west, Mount Roskill to the south and Sandringham to the north. It is bisected by the Oakley Creek, which flows north-west towards the Waitematā Harbour at Waterview. The Southwestern Motorway also bisects the suburb.

History

The area has been settled by Tāmaki Māori iwi hapū and since at least the 13th century. The Oakley Creek, traditionally known as Te Auaunga, was a crayfish, eels and weka for Tāmaki Māori. Harakeke (New Zealand flax) and raupō, which grew along the banks of the creek, were harvested here to create Māori traditional textiles. By the early 18th century, the area was within the rohe of Waiohua. After the defeat of Kiwi Tāmaki, the paramount chief of the iwi, the area became part of the rohe of Ngāti Whātua (modern-day Ngāti Whātua Ōrākei).

In 1850, the Weslayan Mission was gifted 280 acres by the Crown between Stoddard Road and Ōwairaka / Mount Albert, which became known as the Mission Swamp, or Wesley Estate. In 1944, the New Zealand Government purchased a large section of land known as the Lower Wesley Block, and developed the area as state housing in the mid to late 1940s. This followed the Upper Wesley Block to the east, (modern Mount Roskill), where Wesley College and mission was located. Construction on the state housing area was finished in the early 1950s, which saw the opening of Wesley Primary school in 1951, followed by Wesley Intermediate School in 1953. A community centre was planned for the new suburb, however the First National Government of New Zealand in the 1950s was les interested in the construction of community centres, and the facility remained unbuilt. The Black Hall, a private building constructed during the 1951 New Zealand waterfront dispute, acted as a community centre, until the hall was damaged in 1968.

In 1948 and 1953, the Wesley suffered from substantial flooding from the Oakley Creek. Because of this, the Mount Roskill Borough Council invested substantial money into anti-flooding measures around the creek.

Demographics

Wesley had a population of 5,652 at the 2018 New Zealand census, an increase of 282 people (5.3%) since the 2013 census, and an increase of 489 people (9.5%) since the 2006 census. There were 1,491 households, comprising 2,889 males and 2,760 females, giving a sex ratio of 1.05 males per female, with 1,296 people (22.9%) aged under 15 years, 1,605 (28.4%) aged 15 to 29, 2,241 (39.6%) aged 30 to 64, and 504 (8.9%) aged 65 or older.

Ethnicities were 18.4% European/Pākehā, 8.8% Māori, 38.3% Pacific peoples, 37.5% Asian, and 8.2% other ethnicities. People may identify with more than one ethnicity.

The percentage of people born overseas was 50.5, compared with 27.1% nationally.

Although some people chose not to answer the census's question about religious affiliation, 23.5% had no religion, 43.9% were Christian, 0.3% had Māori religious beliefs, 8.1% were Hindu, 15.0% were Muslim, 1.9% were Buddhist and 2.3% had other religions.

Of those at least 15 years old, 927 (21.3%) people had a bachelor's or higher degree, and 798 (18.3%) people had no formal qualifications. 315 people (7.2%) earned over $70,000 compared to 17.2% nationally. The employment status of those at least 15 was that 1,848 (42.4%) people were employed full-time, 612 (14.0%) were part-time, and 291 (6.7%) were unemployed.

Landmarks and amenities

The Hinaki Eel Trap Bridge, which crosses the Oakley Creek.
Mt Roskill War Memorial Hall, in War Memorial Park.
The Oakley Creek, a major stream on the Auckland isthmus. The creek is bordered by a number of public parks, including the War Memorial Park, Walmsley Park and Underwood Park.
The Wesley Community Centre, Opening in 2003, the building won the New Zealand Institute of Architects Regional Award, and an award from the Concrete Society.

Education

Both schools are coeducational. Rolls are as of 

Local state or state-integrated secondary schools include Mount Albert Grammar School, Marist College and St Peter's College.

Local government 

The first local government in the area was the Mt Roskill Highway Board, that formed on 7 August 1868 to administer and fund the roads in the area. In 1883, the Highway Board became the Mt Roskill Road Board. Wesley was a part of the Mt Roskill Borough between 1947 and 1989, after which it was amalgamated into Auckland City. On 1 November 2010, the Auckland Council was formed as a unitary authority governing the entire Auckland Region, and Wesley become a part of the Puketāpapa local board area, administered by the Puketāpapa Local Board. The Puketāpapa local board area forms a part of the Albert-Eden-Puketāpapa ward, which votes for two members of the Auckland Council. The Albert-Eden-Puketāpapa ward is represented by counsellors Christine Fletcher and Julie Fairey.

References

Bibliography

Puketāpapa Local Board Area
Suburbs of Auckland